The history of the Jews in Khaybar flourished in Khaybar during the 7th century, which is now located some 95 miles to the north of Medina (ancient Yathrib)

Migration to Khaybar
The first migration of Jews to Khaybar dates back, by some accounts, to the time of king David, others date it back to the time of Babylonian exile 
The Jewish settlers of Khaybar were the descendants of Shephatiah the son of Mahalalel from the tribe of Judah and some settlers were descendants of the Cohanim

Economic activity
The Jews of Khaybar pioneered the cultivation of the oasis and made their living growing date palm trees, as well as through commerce and craftsmanship, accumulating considerable wealth. Some objects found by the Muslims when they entered Khaybar—a siege-engine, 20 bales of Yemenite cloth, and 500 cloaks—point out to an intense trade carried out by the Jews. In the past some scholars attempted to explain the siege-engine by suggesting that it was used for settling quarrels among the families of the community. Today most academics believe it was stored in a depôt for future sale, in the same way that swords, lances, shields, and other weaponry had been sold by the Jews to Arabs. Equally, the cloth and the cloaks may have been intended for sale, as it was unlikely that such a quantity of luxury goods were kept for the exclusive use of the Jews. However, these commercial activities led to some resentment that is similar to the economic causes that were behind persecutions in many other countries throughout history.

Expulsion of the Jews from Khaybar
During the reign of Caliph Umar (634–644), the Jewish community of Khaybar were transported alongside the Christian community of Najran to the newly conquered regions of Syria and Iraq. As a settlement, Umar issued orders that these Christians and Jews should be treated well and allotted them land in their new settlements equivalent to the land they initially owned. However, Umar also forbade Non-Muslims to reside in the Hejaz for longer than three days. Since then, the Jews of Khaybar traveled around many areas throughout the Caliphate as artisans and merchants and maintained a distinctive identity until the 12th century.

See also
 Khaybar
 Battle of Khaybar
 Safiyya bint Huyayy
 Makhamra family
 Antisemitism in the Arab world
 Islam and antisemitism

References

Khaybar
Khaybar
Khaybar
Khaybar
Jews